Deprivation or deprive may refer to:
 Poverty, pronounced deprivation in well-being
 Objective deprivation or poverty threshold, the minimum level of income deemed adequate in a particular country
 Relative deprivation, the lack of resources to sustain the lifestyle that one is accustomed to or that a society approves
 Deprivation (child development), inadequate meeting of child's needs required for an adequate child development 
 Deprivation of rights under color of law, a federal criminal offense under U.S. law
 Deprivation, the taking away from a clergyman of his benefice or other spiritual promotion or dignity by an ecclesiastical court

See also
 
 Forfeiture (law), deprivation of a right in consequence of the non-performance of some obligation
 Hypoxia (medical), a medical condition where the body is deprived of adequate oxygen supply at the tissue level
 Child neglect, abuse that results in a deprivation of a child's basic needs